South Korean singer and the low-pitch (baritone) vocalist of SS501, Park Jung-min has released two studio albums (one is an album dedicated to his 10th debut anniversary), two EPs, 20 singles, 4 soundtrack contribution songs, 3 DVDs, and 7 music compositions.

During 2005-2010, JungMin has had two solo songs from SS501 albums: "Here" from Kokoro, and "If You Cannot" with Ji-sun from SS501 Solo Collection. He also sang "Only Me" in 2009, but was not released until 2010 in Superstar OST.

JungMin released his debut solo single, Not Alone. He, then released his first mini-album The, Park Jung Min in April, and Wara Wara The, Park Jung Min for Japanese limited edition in May.

In 2012, JungMin contributed to Fondant Garden Taiwanese drama OST, in which he was the main lead, entitled "Bad Person". Later on, Park JungMin debuted in Japan using the name 'ROMEO' under Victor Music. He released two albums, named Give Me Your Heart and Tonight's The Night in September and October respectively. Afterwards, he returned to Korea to continue his music career as 'Park JungMin' and released his first self-produced single album entitled Beautiful. At the end of the year, he released a full length Japanese album Midnight Theatre back as ROMEO.

In 2014, he released Save Us Tonight in Japan under his real name, Park JungMin.  In the same year, JungMin further released 'Summer Break', 'Softly', 'Winter Love' and also 'Christmas Kiss' singles.

In 2015, JungMin released 'It's Summer Time....' and 'Last Breath'.  Before started his 2 years military service, JungMin has pre-recorded the following (and released later in 2015/2016):  'Run Away', 'In The Forest' and 'Faith'.

In 2016, JungMin released a limited edition single 'Happiness' on his birthday.  Recently, in January 2017, JungMin/ROMEO released 'Toxic Love' (all are pre-recorded before JungMin started his military service).

Studio albums

Extended plays

Singles

Soundtrack contributions

Video albums

Videography

Music videos

Others

Production credits

Concerts/Major Fan meetings

The following is an incomplete list of Park Jung-min's concerts, major fanmeetings, and tours.

See also
 SS501 discography
 Kim Hyun-joong discography
 Heo Young-saeng discography
 Kim Kyu-jong discography
 Kim Hyung-jun discography

References

External links

  
  
 
 
 
 

SS501
Discographies of South Korean artists
Pop music discographies